Agios Athanasios is an independent municipality of Cyprus located in the Limassol District. Located 3km (1.86 mi) away from the district's capital, Limassol, and named after the Athanasius of Alexandria, it functions as a suburb of the city.

History
Agios Athanasios was founded as a minor agricultural settlement and followed a huge refugee immigration boom after the 1974 Turkish invasion. It is estimated that around 6,000 refugees are settled in the city. The municipality serves as the industrial area of the Limassol District.

Mayors
 1986 - 1996: Phidias Diamantis
 1996 - 2016: Kyriakos Chatzittofi
 2016 - Present: Marinos Kyriakou

References

Municipalities in Limassol District